Élie Dohin (born 29 July 1983 in Orléans) is a French football midfielder.

References

1983 births
Living people
French footballers
FC Libourne players
AC Ajaccio players
Ligue 2 players
Footballers from Orléans
LB Châteauroux players
US Boulogne players
US Lège Cap Ferret players
Association football midfielders